AM Bank (or Al-Mawarid Bank, Arabic: بنك الموارد) is a Lebanese medium-size bank that was established in 1980, by Salim Khaireddine, Maroun Kissirwani, and Omar Jundi. The bank provides basic banking services, card processing, investment banking and insurance brokerage.

The bank was the first in the country to introduce credit cards in 1995 and to mobile banking in 2010.

It is registered under Banque du Liban list at #101.

Board of directors

 Marwan Kheireddine (Chairman, General Manager)
 Ibrahim Hanna Daher
 Majid Jumblat
 Omar Jundi
 Edmond Jreissati
 Ibrahim Houssamy
 Mahmoud Zeidan
 Wassim Khaireddine

Products and services 
The bank provides commercial banking products and services, including current and saving account options with credit, debit and prepaid cards available. It offers personal loans, car loans, educational loans and housing loans. It also offers insurance and investment plans.  Other services include online and mobile banking, bills domiciliation, delivery service and loyalty card programs.

Location and branches
The branch network covers major Lebanese provinces, with headquarters in Beirut.

Full-service branches are found in: Hamra, Aley, Baakline, Mar Elias, Manassef, Shtaura, Sheheem, Maten, Tripoli, Dora, Hasbaya, Dahieh, Cola, Jounieh, Saifi, Verdun and Achrafieh.

New identity
The bank launched its new corporate identity in October 2012.

International correspondents

See also

 Lebanese Canadian Bank
 Byblos Bank
 Jammal Trust Bank
 Economy of lebanon
 Beirut Stock Exchange

References 

1980 establishments in Lebanon
Banks established in 1980
Banks of Lebanon
Companies based in Beirut